Derryloughan may refer to:

Derryloughan, County Armagh, a townland in County Armagh, Northern Ireland
Derryloughan, County Tyrone, a townland in County Tyrone, Northern Ireland